Hill tribe (Northern Thai: จาวดอย, คนดอย, ; 'mountain people/folk') is a term used in Thailand for all of the various ethnic groups who mostly inhabit the high mountainous northern and western regions of Thailand, including both sides of the border areas between northern Thailand, Laos and Burma, the Phi Pan Nam Range, the Thanon Range, the latter a southern prolongation of the Shan Hills, as well as the Tenasserim Hills in Western Thailand. These areas exhibit mountainous terrain which is in some areas covered by thick forests, while in others it has been heavily affected by deforestation.

The hill dwelling peoples have traditionally been primarily subsistence farmers who use slash-and-burn agricultural techniques to farm their heavily forested communities. Popular perceptions that slash and burn practices are environmentally destructive, governmental concerns over borderland security, and population pressure has caused the government to forcibly relocate many hill tribe peoples. Traditionally, hill tribes were a migratory people, leaving land as it became depleted of resources. Cultural and adventure travel tourism resulting in visiting the tribal villages is an increasing source of income for the hill tribes.

The mountain peoples are severely disadvantaged by comparison with the dominant Thai ethnic group. A 2013 article in the Bangkok Post said that "Nearly a million hill peoples and forest dwellers are still treated as outsiders—criminals even, since most live in protected forests. Viewed as national security threats, hundreds of thousands of them are refused citizenship although many are natives to the land". The Ministry of Social Development and Human Security's 2015 Master Plan for the Development of Ethnic Groups in Thailand 2015-2017 listed 13 mountain peoples and recognized problems in five areas, namely a lack of rights and uncertainty in housing, a lack of rights in legal status, a lack of stability in life, and weaknesses in bureaucratic planning. It sought to provide a planning framework to address these issues. The Master Plan was not renewed after 2017; it was 'subsumed' into planning by the Office of the National Security Council and by the Ministry of Culture.

The term "hill tribe"
In the 19th century, the tribes living in the mountain ranges were the largest non-Buddhist group in Thailand. Their mountain locations were then considered remote and difficult to access. In Thai official documents, the term hill tribe (chao khao) began to appear in the 1960s. This term highlights a "hill and valley" dichotomy that is based on ancient social relationships existing in most of northern and western Thailand, as well as in Sipsongpanna and Northern Vietnam. For the most part, the Dai/Tai/Thai people occupied the more fertile intermontane basins and the valleys, while the less powerful groups lived in the poorer, higher elevations. This dichotomy was often also characterized by a master/serf relationship.

"Highland Thais" is a more recent term also used to designate groups living in the mountainous areas.

Main groups

The seven major hill tribes in Thailand are the Akha, Lahu, Karen, Mien/Yao, Lisu, and Palaung, each with a distinct language and culture.

The Akha

The Akha are closely related to the Hani of China's Yunnan province. They are also known derogatorily in Thai as the Gaw or the E-gaw. The Akha are one of the dominant cultural influences in the area. There are two to three million Akha and Akha-Hani in total, 70,000 of whom live in Thailand. The Akha speak a language in the Lolo/Yi branch of the Tibeto-Burman language group, but have no traditional written language.

Although many Akha, especially younger people, profess Christianity, Akha Zang ('The Akha Way') still runs deep in their consciousness. The Akha are a shamanic group that share the ancient universal archetype that the Goddess spins a universe where nature is not distinguished from humankind. They embody the essence of its consciousness into a holistic continuum where there is no dichotomy between themselves and the natural world. The Akha Way, a prescribed lifestyle derived from religious chants, combines animism, ancestor worship, shamanism and a deep relationship with the land. The Akha Way emphasizes rituals in everyday life and stresses strong family ties and the hymn of creation; every Akha male can recount his genealogy back over fifty generations to the first Akha, Sm Mi O.

The Lahu

The Yao

The Yao people are composed of several different groups and they speak different languages which are used to differentiate them. The Iu Mien make up 70% of the Yao population.

The Yao people were said to be the first civilization in China according to the chanting song story, Iu Mien Elders, a shaman's worship book written by Iu Mien elders in ancient Chinese characters. The Iu Mien nation was located in the southern part of China today known as Guangdong, Guangxi and Hunan provinces and was ruled by the king of the Iu Mien people. The last Iu Mien king was King Pan, the namesake of the modern Iu Mien surnames: Phan, Saephanh, Saephan, Phanh, Pharn, Pan, Pham. King Pan and the Chinese emperor declared war against each other 800 years ago over disputed territory. The Iu Mien, led by King Pan, were fighting to protect their people and their territory. King Pan and the Iu Mien were decimated. King Pan lost countless soldiers and civilian casualties as well as territory to the Chinese emperor. The Chinese emperor captured most of the Iu Mien's territory. Iu Mien and King Pan were left unable to resist, which forced King Pan to negotiate with the Chinese emperor. The Chinese emperor gave two options to King Pan and Iu Mien people: Surrender to the Chinese emperor and sign a treaty to give all territory to the Chinese emperor, or continue to fight until the Chinese wiped out Iu Mien society utterly.

King Pan and his government chose to give up all territories to China and signed the treaty called "Passport to travel in the hill" or "Passport to cross the mountain". This document contained relevant information. The Chinese emperor had written this document in Chinese character.

"Iu Mien people have rights to maintain their identity, language, culture, and worship system and live on the hill side or in the mountain to cultivate land for farming and crops and raise their family. The Iu Mien would not be allowed to form their own government and have no rights to pursue their own nation. Iu Mien who possess this document have the legal right to cross all territories and borders to settle and to build their village in the hill/mountain to make a living by farming without hindrance by government. The governments of that country are responsible for their well-being and educating them to follow the rules of laws of the country that Iu Mien are living in."

After the loss of their nation, the 12 existing clans of Iu Mien people had to separate into small villages due to the mountainous area and foot hill land. Each village consisted of 15 to 20 families. The majority of people in each village were related. In some cases, they kept their clan together. They practiced slash-and-burn agriculture. Hunting and fishing were their primary means of acquiring food. Iu Mien women minded the household chores and children. Iu Mien's written language is similar to Chinese characters which is for religious and chant only songs. There was no written language for daily speaking. When their soil was exhausted, they moved to a new place in the tropical forest to start a new life and a new village all over again. Iu Mien people were scattered all over the mountains in China. The mountains where they lived became deserts because of the slash and burn farming. They sought new places in mountainous areas. They searched further south and eventually moved into Vietnam.

The Karen

The K’nyaw,() known to many as Karen, and to others as Kariang or Yang, are one of the largest hill tribes in Southeast Asia. The total number of Karen people is unknown as they are spread throughout Burma, Laos, and Thailand, and no reliable census has been conducted in Burma since the 1930s. Population estimates range from 7.5 million to 14 million people. (The more conservative estimate makes their population equivalent to that of Switzerland). The approximately 320,000 Karen in Thailand comprise half of the country's total hill tribe population.

While the Karen still practice slash-and-burn agriculture as other hill tribes do, they differ in that they live in permanent villages at lower elevations and have been aggressive in developing environmentally sustainable terraced rice fields. These factors have allowed the Karen to better integrate themselves into Thai society.

The Lisu

The Palaung

See also
 Ethnic groups in Thailand
 Highland People Discovery Museum
 Hill people
 List of hill tribes of Thailand
 Southeast Asian Massif
 Thai highlands
 Zomia (geography)

References

External links 
 Virtual Hill Tribe Museum
 Hill Tribe Museum (tripadvisor)

Ethnic groups in China
Ethnic groups in Laos
Ethnic groups in Myanmar
Ethnic groups in Thailand
Hill people